Ericameria is a genus of North American shrubs in the family Asteraceae.

Ericameria is known by the common names goldenbush, rabbitbrush, turpentine bush, and rabbitbush. Most are shrubs but one species (E. parishii) can reach tree stature. They are distributed in western Canada (Saskatchewan, Alberta, British Columbia) western United States (from the western Great Plains to the Pacific) and northern Mexico. Bright yellow flower heads adorn the plants in late summer. All the species have disc florets, while some have ray florets but others do not. Ericameria nauseosa, (synonym Chrysothamnus nauseosus), is known for its production of latex.

Etymology 
Ericameria is based on the genus name Erica and the Greek word meros ('part'), in reference to the similarity of the plant's leaves to those of Erica.

Uses 
This genus has a number of admirable landscape plants for heavily alkaline soils, but most species need extensive rejuvenation pruning every three years, making not ideal for common yards.  Overwatering will kill the plants.

Ericameria species are used as food plants by the larvae of some Lepidoptera species including Schinia argentifascia, Schinia tertia, Schinia unimacula and Schinia walsinghami.

Selected species

Ericameria section Asiris
Ericameria albida 
Ericameria arizonica
Ericameria cervina 
Ericameria discoidea
Ericameria gilmanii 
Ericameria lignumviridis 
Ericameria nana 
Ericameria nauseosa (syn. Chrysothamnus nauseosus)
Ericameria obovata 
Ericameria ophitidis 
Ericameria parryi — Parry's rabbitbrush
Ericameria resinosa 
Ericameria watsonii

Ericameria section Ericameria
Ericameria arborescens — Golden-fleece; exclusive food plant of the moth Bucculatrix ericameriae
Ericameria brachylepis — Boundary goldenbush
Ericameria cooperi 
Ericameria cuneata 
Ericameria ericoides — Mock heather, goldenbush
Ericameria fasciculata — Eastwood's goldenbush
Ericameria juarezensis 
Ericameria laricifolia 
Ericameria linearifolia 
Ericameria martirensis 
Ericameria palmeri — Palmer's goldenweed, false broomweed
Ericameria paniculata — Sticky rabbitbrush, black-banded rabbitbrush
Ericameria parishii 
Ericameria pinifolia — Pine goldenbush
Ericameria teretifolia — Needle-leaved rabbitbrush

Ericameria section Macronema
Ericameria bloomeri 
Ericameria compacta 
Ericameria crispa 
Ericameria greenei 
Ericameria suffruticosa 
Ericameria winwardii
Ericameria zionis

References

External links

Jepson Manual Treatment of Ericameria
United States Department of Agriculture Plants Profile for Ericameria

 
Flora of North America
Asteraceae genera
Taxa named by Thomas Nuttall